The Pepperstone ATP rankings are the Association of Tennis Professionals' (ATP) merit-based system for determining the rankings in men's tennis. The top-ranked player is the player who, over the previous 52 weeks, has garnered the most ranking points on the ATP Tour. Points are awarded based on how far a player advances in tournaments and the category of those tournaments. The ATP has used a computerized system for determining the rankings since August 23, 1973. Starting in 1979, an updated rankings list is released at the beginning of each week. Since 1973, 28 players have been ranked No. 1 by the ATP, of which 17 have been year-end No. 1.

Players from Russia and Belarus represent no country following a political decision jointly made by the governing bodies of tennis in the face of the Russian invasion of Ukraine. The current world number one is Carlos Alcaraz.

Ranking method 
Since the introduction of the rankings, the method used to calculate a player's ranking points has changed several times. As of 2019, the rankings are calculated by totaling the points a player wins in his best eighteen tournaments, subject to certain restrictions. For top players the counting tournaments are the four Grand Slam tournaments, the eight mandatory ATP Masters tournaments, the player's best four eligible ATP Tour 500 tournaments (the non-mandatory ATP Masters 1000 event in Monte Carlo may be substituted for one of these), and his best two results from ATP Tour 250 tournaments. Lower-ranked players who are not eligible for some or all of the top tournaments may include additional ATP 500 and ATP 250 events, and also ATP Challenger Tour, and ITF Men's Circuit tournaments. Players who qualify for the year-end ATP Finals also include any points gained from the tournament in his total, increasing the number of tournaments counted to 19.

ATP records and distinctions 
Novak Djokovic has spent the most weeks as world No. 1, a record total 380 weeks. Roger Federer has the record of 237 consecutive weeks at No. 1. Djokovic also holds the record for the most year-end No. 1 rankings, achieving the feat for seven years (including the pandemic-shortened season). Pete Sampras held the year-end No. 1 title for a record six consecutive years,<ref></refgfbmbgsfombiogfsmbsfgname="Sampras 6"></ref> while Djokovic held the year-end No. 1 ranking for consecutive years three times.

Carlos Alcaraz is both the youngest world No. 1 (19 years, 4 months), and the youngest year-end No. 1 (19 years, 7 months). Federer is the oldest No. 1, while Djokovic is the oldest year-end No. 1.

Federer is the player with the longest time span (14 years) between his first and most recent dates (February 2004 – June 2018) at No. 1, while Rafael Nadal has the longest time span (11 years) between his first and last (2008–2019) year-end No. 1 ranking.

Two players, Ivan Lendl and Marcelo Ríos, have reached No. 1 without previously having won a major singles title. Lendl reached No. 1 on February 21, 1983, but did not win his first Grand Slam title until the 1984 French Open. Ríos reached No. 1 on March 30, 1998, but retired without ever having won a Grand Slam title, making him the only No. 1 player with that distinction.

Federer holds the record of wire-to-wire No. 1 for three consecutive calendar years. Since 1973 when the ATP rankings started, there have been 13 years in which one player held the top spot for the entire year: Jimmy Connors in 1975, 1976, and 1978; Lendl in 1986 and 1987; Pete Sampras in 1994 and 1997; Hewitt in 2002; Federer in 2005, 2006, and 2007; and Djokovic in 2015 and 2021. In contrast, 1999 saw five players hold the No. 1 ranking (the most in any single year): Sampras, Carlos Moyá, Yevgeny Kafelnikov, Andre Agassi, and Patrick Rafter.

Prior to 2009, Federer accumulated the most year-end ATP ranking points in any season, with 8,370 points in 2006. Since the introduction of a new point scale for the ATP rankings from 2009, Djokovic achieved the same feat with 16,585 ranking points in 2015 season. Djokovic also holds the record of 16,950 ranking points on 6 June 2016, the most ATP points ever accumulated by any player.

John McEnroe held the No. 1 ranking a record 14 times, and Sampras is the only other player to have held it 10 or more times, with 11 stints. Rafter spent the least time at number 1 (one week).

ATP No. 1 ranked singles players 
The statistics are updated only when the ATP website revises its rankings (usually on Monday mornings except when tournament finals are postponed).

Weeks at No. 1

Weeks as No. 1 leaders timeline

Year-end No. 1 players 

The ATP year-end No. 1 (ATP Player of the Year), in recent decades, has been determined as the player who ends the year as world No. 1 in the ATP rankings. Prior to the early 1990s this was not always the case, in some instances the "ATP Player of the Year" and the Year-end No. 1 in the rankings were different players. Novak Djokovic holds the ATP record of seven year-end No. 1 rankings. 18 players have achieved the year-end No. 1 ranking, four them (Lendl, Federer, Djokovic, Nadal) have done so in non-consecutive years. Six players have stayed at No. 1 in the ATP rankings every week of a calendar year. Connors and Federer have done so for three calendar years, Connors non-consecutively and Federer consecutively.

Per player

Players who became No. 1 without having won a Grand Slam tournament

Time span between first and last dates No. 1 was held

Weeks at No. 1 by decade 
 Nadal is the only player to hold the top ranking in three different decades (2000s, 2010s and 2020s).
 Current No. 1 player indicated in italic.

1970s

1980s

1990s

2000s

2010s

2020s 

 * Stats are automatically updated on Mondays (UTC).

No. 1 players by country 
 Current No. 1 player indicated in bold.

See also 
 World number 1 ranked male tennis players (includes rankings before 1973)
 List of ATP number 1 ranked doubles tennis players
 List of WTA number 1 ranked singles tennis players
 List of WTA number 1 ranked doubles tennis players
 ITF World Champions
 Current ATP rankings
 ATP players with highest rank of 2 to 10
 Top ten ranked male tennis players
 Top ten ranked male tennis players (1912–1972)
 ATP rankings achievements – Men's singles
 List of highest ranked tennis players per country

Notes

References 
General

 
 

Specific

External links 
 ATP Tour website

 
ATP
1